Three Mounted Men is a 1918 American silent Western film directed by John Ford (credited as Jack Ford) and featuring Harry Carey. The film is considered to be lost.

Plot
As described in a film magazine, Cheyenne Harry (Carey) is promised his liberty from prison if he will capture "dead or alive" Buck Masters (Harris), a worthless and desperate character. Harry agrees, and in short order he has won the confidence of the bad man and they agree to hold up the night stage coach. Harry tips off the sheriff and the tough is caught. Harry then finds that this has robbed a poor girl, Lola (Gerber), and her mother (Lafayette) of their only support. Harry relents and, with his two pals, they kidnap the thief from the sheriff's automobile and make off with him. Harry rides off to begin life anew with Lola, the desperado's sister.

Cast
 Harry Carey as Cheyenne Harry
 Joe Harris as Buck Masters
 Neva Gerber as Lola Masters
 Harry Carter as The Warden's Son
 Ruby Lafayette as Mrs. Masters
 Charles Hill Mailes as Warden
 Mrs. Anna Townsend as Harry's Mother 
 Ella Hall as Undetermined Role

Reception
Like many American films of the time, Three Mounted Men was subject to cuts by city and state film censorship boards. For example, the Chicago Board of Censors required a cut, in Reel 1, of the last choking scene, Reel 2, the second part of the letter beginning with "If you try to get me" etc., Reel 4, one scene of a young woman at the bar, Reel 5, the two intertitles "I am going to prove I am your friend" etc. and "The stage will reach Red Gulch at nine o'clock", and, Reel 6, the first stage holdup scene.

See also
 Harry Carey filmography
 List of lost films

References

External links
 
 

1918 films
1918 lost films
1918 Western (genre) films
American black-and-white films
Films directed by John Ford
Lost Western (genre) films
Lost American films
Silent American Western (genre) films
Universal Pictures films
1910s American films